LWRC R.E.P.R. MKII (Rapid Engagement Precision Rifle) is a semi-automatic 7.62 caliber, and 6.5mm Creedmoor or rifle manufactured by LWRC International.

Design details 
The rifle is built on the AR-10 platform which takes a 7.62 mm cartridge. The rifle has a Geissele trigger, and Magpul Industries components. It also has a proprietary 4 port Muzzle brake. It has ambidextrous controls The barrel is cold hammer forged, Black Nitride treated, and has. 1:10 twist. The gun can be fitted with a 20", 16", or 12" barrel. The barrel is carbon-fiber-wrapped. The gun has a full-length Picatinny rail.

Operation 
The gun operates with a short Stroke piston. It weighs 13 pounds when loaded with ammunition. The gun's purpose is for hunting, long-range shooting competition and law enforcement. The average velocity of a bullet fired from the REPR is 2,711.2mph. The gun is equipped with a 20-round magazine.

References

7.62 mm firearms
Rifles of the United States
LWRC International semi-automatic firearms
Short stroke piston firearms
2010 introductions
ArmaLite AR-10 derivatives
6.5×55mm rifles